CBS Sports Network (a.k.a. CBSSN) is an American pay television network owned by the CBS Entertainment Group unit of Paramount Global. When it launched in 2002 as the National College Sports Network (later College Sports Television also known as CSTV), it operated as a multi-platform media brand which also included its primary website, collegesports.com, and a network of websites operated for the athletic departments of 215 colleges and universities.

After CSTV was acquired by CBS in 2006 (handed over from Viacom who purchased the network the previous year), the network was re-branded as the CBS College Sports Network in 2008. The network initially maintained its college sports focus, but in February 2011, the service was re-branded as CBS Sports Network to re-position it as a mainstream sports service. The network continues to have a particular focus on college sports, along with coverage of smaller leagues and events, simulcasts of sports radio shows from both the CBS Sports Radio network and Entercom's WFAN (formerly owned outright by CBS), and studio and analysis programming.

As of May 2015, CBSSN was available to approximately 61 million pay television households (66.1% of households with cable television) in the United States.

History

The network's roots began in 1999 when Chris Bevilacqua approached the co-founders of the Classic Sports Network, Brian Bedol and Stephen D. Greenberg (son of Hank Greenberg) – at that time, running Fusient Media Ventures, a New York-based sports and media company – with the idea for a subscription network featuring college sports 24 hours a day. Under the leadership of Bedol as CEO, the network was originally named the National College Sports Network in June 2002, was subsequently renamed College Sports Television (CSTV) and launched on February 23, 2003. From their headquarters and studio operations at Chelsea Piers in New York City, CSTV was the first independent pay-television channel to be distributed nationwide, having been carried on satellite provider DirecTV at launch.

In November 2005, College Sports Television was purchased by Viacom for $325 million. CBS Corporation (Viacom's legal successor) took control of the network in January 2006. On January 3, 2008, it was announced that CSTV would be integrated into CBS Sports, with the sports division's executive vice president and executive producer, Tony Petitti, taking over day-to-day operational management of CSTV, which would be overseen by CBS News and Sports president Sean McManus. CSTV co-founder Brian Bedol would become a senior advisor to CBS Corporation president and CEO Leslie Moonves (Petitti has since left CBS to take on the same role for the MLB Network).

In the fall of 2006, CSTV launched more than 100 broadband channels dedicated to college sports, which feature more than 10,000 live events. The subscription/pay-per-view service, called CBS College Sports XXL, and its portfolio of broadband channels in its All-Access suite, include coverage of Notre Dame, Southern California, Kansas, Ohio State and North Carolina.

CBS reorganization
On February 12, 2008, CBS Corporation announced that, as part of the ongoing integration of CSTV into CBS Sports, that the network would be renamed the CBS College Sports Network on March 16, coinciding with the start of CBS's coverage of the NCAA's basketball tournament. Studio shows moved from the original Chelsea Piers headquarters to the CBS Broadcast Center on West 57th Street in 2012. As part of the relaunch, the network added a new news program, College Sports Tonight. That program was canceled in 2010, however other studio shows (including Inside College Football and Inside College Basketball) still originate from the Chelsea Piers location.

On February 15, 2011, CBS announced that the network would be relaunched as CBS Sports Network on April 4 (coinciding with the end of the 2011 NCAA basketball tournament), to reflect an expansion into non-collegiate sports programming.

High definition

A high definition simulcast feed of the channel, broadcasting at 1080i, was launched in August 2008. Prior to the launch of the feed, the two NCAA basketball tournament games that aired in March 2008, which were presented in HD on CBS, were converted to a standard definition feed. CBSSN uses the AFD #10 broadcast flag to present programming on its standard definition feed in letterboxed widescreen for viewers watching through 4:3 television sets.

Programming
CBSSN televises original programming, features, talk shows and documentaries as well as extensive women's sports coverage. Its regular season and championship event coverage draws from every major collegiate athletic conference and division, in addition to nine NCAA championships. CBSSN televises 35 men's and women's college sports including football, basketball, baseball, ultimate, hockey, lacrosse, soccer, wrestling and volleyball from every major conference. The network holds multi-media and marketing rights for the Mountain West Conference, the Atlantic 10 Conference, Conference USA, the Patriot League, Army football and Navy football.

In April 2006, the network organized the first Collegiate Nationals, a festival of championships dedicated to crowning champions in a wide variety of collegiate action sports such as snowboarding, wakeboarding and beach volleyball. More than 1,000 competitors converged on Reno-Tahoe to compete, the largest number ever for an event of its kind. For its second installment in 2007, the Collegiate Nationals added sports and other events such as national film and music competitions, as well as a second venue – San Diego. The third year, 2008, brought further changes, as the winter sports events were moved to the Keystone Resort near Boulder, Colorado and competitive eating was added.

In the fall of 2006, CSTV and Comcast launched the MountainWest Sports Network (colloquially known as The Mtn.), a network focusing exclusively on the Mountain West Conference. The relation with the network also gave CSTV exclusive online and broadcasting rights to Notre Dame's game at Air Force on November 11, 2006 – which caused controversy since CSTV did not have carriage as widely distributed as other networks that have aired Notre Dame games. The Irish did not revisit a Mountain West team until a 2013 game at Air Force, which once again aired on CBSSN.

2010s
On April 3, 2012, CBSSN premiered Rome, a sports news and talk program hosted by nationally syndicated radio host Jim Rome; Rome had recently left ESPN and his previous show, Jim Rome Is Burning, after signing a new contract with CBS Sports. Rome ended in March 2015, but the channel subsequently announced in October 2017 that it will add a television simulcast of his radio program, The Jim Rome Show, beginning January 2, 2018.

On June 7, 2012, CBSSN began to air the remaining games of the American Hockey League's 2012 Calder Cup Final between the Norfolk Admirals and the Toronto Marlies, starting with Game 3. On July 26, 2012, the network signed a deal with the United Football League – a second-tier professional football league that began play in October 2009 – to televise its games for the 2012 season. The UFL paid for all production expenses and received no rights fee from CBSSN for the broadcasts. The league lasted approximately four weeks on CBSSN before suspending operations halfway through the season.

In September 2012, CBSSN introduced the new NFL studio show NFL Monday QB. The following season, CBSSN premiered That Other Pre-Game Show, a weekly, four-hour studio show on Sunday mornings hosted by Adam Schein, Jonathan Jones, Kyle Long, Amy Trask, and Brock Vereen, designed to be a more "casual" and "fan-focused" counterpart to CBS's own The NFL Today and competitors (such as ESPN's Sunday NFL Countdown). 

On April 26, 2013, the network announced that it had signed a deal with the GEICO Motorcycle AMA Pro Road Racing Series for the remainder of the 2013 and the 2014 seasons. The network aired flag to flag coverage for the races as well as live coverage for several of the races. The network broadcast the FIA WTCC Race of the United States from Sonoma Raceway on September 8, 2013.

On December 2, 2013, CBSSN announced that it was to begin simulcasting the Boomer and Carton (now Boomer and Gio) morning show from then co-owned sports talk radio station WFAN in New York City in January 2014.

In October 2014, CBSSN launched a new talk show, We Need To Talk, which became the first, and only, nationally televised all-female sports panel show. Regular panellists include former professional boxer Laila Ali, former professional basketball player Lisa Leslie and USTA President Katrina Adams.

In August 2015, the network premiered Time to Schein, a new program hosted by Adam Schein.

In July 2017, the network announced a new documentary series, Four Sides of the Story, to examine notable moments in sports from four perspectives each; the series premiere focused on the Villanova Wildcats' buzzer beater at the 2016 NCAA Division I Men's Basketball Championship Game.

CBSSN was one of three cable broadcasters of the Alliance of American Football—a second-tier developmental football league, alongside NFL Network and TNT. A weekly game and one playoff game were assigned to CBSSN. As was the case with the UFL, the AAF paid CBSSN for the airtime; the AAF abruptly ceased operations before the season ended.

On April 4, 2019, the 3-on-3 basketball league Big3 announced that it would move to CBS and CBSSN for its 2019 season. CBSSN will air at least 25 hours of coverage, including coverage of the league's draft.

On April 22, 2019, CBS Sports reached an agreement to televise select games from the WNBA; coverage is now split between CBS and ESPN/ABC (who up to that point had held exclusive rights since ).

In November 2019, it was reported that CBS Sports had acquired the U.S. English-language broadcast rights to the UEFA Champions League beginning in the 2021-22 season, with CBSSN expected to be incorporated into the coverage. CBS would end up starting its coverage a year earlier in 2020 after acquiring the  rights to the remainder of the 2019–20 and 2020-21 seasons after Turner Sports opted out of its remaining contract.

2020s
On January 9, 2020, the Mountain West Conference announced that it had reached a new six-year deal with CBS and Fox Sports for its top-tier basketball and football rights. CBSSN will remain the conference's primary broadcaster with 23 football games and 23 men's basketball games per-season, and there will be an option for selected games and the conference men's basketball championship to air on CBS, and events in Olympic sports to air on CBSSN beginning in 2021. The Mountain West football championship and Boise State home games will move to a Fox network.

CBSSN acquired a package of World of Outlaws events from June 20 to July 4.

On September 11, 2020, Bellator MMA announced that its events would move to CBSSN moving forward, after having previously aired on Paramount Network, which is in the process of abandoning non-scripted development in favor of films. Bellator and Paramount Network were under Viacom when the company merged with CBS Corporation to form ViacomCBS. However, only five months later, the promotion announced that it would instead move to CBS's sister premium network Showtime.

On April 19, 2021, the World Series of Poker and CBS Sports announced a multi-year rights agreement with PokerGO to become the domestic television partner for the WSOP Main Event and various WSOP bracelet events, ending its long-term relationship with ESPN.

Beginning in January 2023, CBS Sports HQ has produced a three hour sports information show for CBS Sports Network entitled CBS Sports HQ Spotlight.

Sports broadcast rights

College sports

Professional sports
 UEFA Champions League (2020–present)
 Group and knockout stages only
 UEFA Champions League final (2020)
 UEFA Europa League (2020–present)
 All group and knockout stages
 UEFA Europa League final
 UEFA Super Cup (2020–present)
 UEFA Europa Conference League (starting in 2021–22 season)
Scottish Professional Football League (2021–2025)
Scottish Premiership
 Scottish Championship
Scottish League Cup
Big3 basketball (2019)
 Encore presentations (2021–present)
WNBA (2019–present)
 NWSL (2020–present)
 Professional Bull Riders (2012–present)
 Weekly coverage
 Major League Rugby (2017–present)
 PGA Tour on CBS (2012–present)
 Masters on the Range (2013–present)
 PGA Championship on the Range (2012–present)
 World's Strongest Man (2013–present)
 Full coverage of competitions, beginning in 2013.
 Reruns of past World's Strongest Man competitions
Tennis on CBS
World TeamTennis (2019–present)
Davis Cup (2020–present)
 Bellator MMA (2020–2021)
 3ICE Hockey (starting in 2022)
 Athletes Unlimited Softball (2020–present)
 World Series of Poker (2021–present)

Motorsports
 Lucas Oil Off Road Racing Series (2010–2020)
 World Racing Group (2013–present)
World of Outlaws NOS Energy Sprint Cars (2013–present, select races such as World Finals and Kings Royal)
World of Outlaws Morton Buildings Late Models (2013–present, select races such as World Finals and Prairie Dirt Classic)
Super DIRTcar Series Big Block Modifieds (2013-2015, select races such as Super DIRT Week and World Finals)
 Stadium Super Trucks (2014–present)
 AMSOIL Championship Snowcross (2013–present)
 Trans-Am Series (2015–present)
 SCCA National Championship Runoffs (2017–present)
 eShort Course World Cup (2021–present)
 Formula E (2021–present)
 Championship Off-Road (2022–present)
 Kicker AMA Arenacross Series (2022–present)
 Best in the Desert (2022–2024, select races)

Carriage
CBSSN is available nationally on most subscription television providers in the United States.

In Canada, Rogers Cable began carrying CBSSN on October 9, 2008. Satellite provider Bell Satellite TV started carrying the channel on September 3, 2009 and stopped on August 21, 2014 (they subsequently brought the channel back August 2015). Certain programs aired by the network (particularly NFL and NCAA basketball tournament related programs and other programs whose rights are owned by other broadcasters) are blacked out in Canada, and replaced with reruns of other events or studio programs. CBSSN is the only U.S.-based mainstream sports service that is carried on pay television in Canada.  As of 2020, it is only available on Bell Fibe TV, Cogeco and Eastlink.

In late February 2009, CBSSN reached a new carriage agreement with DirecTV, which allowed the satellite provider to move the channel from its add on "Sports Pack" to its "Choice Xtra" base package; the move became effective on February 25, 2009, expanding the channel's distribution to 30 million subscribers.

On July 7, 2009, Cox Communications announced that it would add the channel to its systems in Orange County, California and Arizona on August 1, 2009. AT&T U-verse added the network on February 17, 2010. On August 1, 2011, Cable One added the network in select markets.

On July 20, 2019, DirecTV and AT&T U-verse removed it from their lineup due to a carriage dispute with CBS Corporation. The channel was re-added on August 8, 2019 to both platforms as they reached a multi-year content carriage agreement. On August 1, 2022, DirecTV, U-verse TV, and DirecTV Stream removed it again from their lineup due to a carriage dispute with Paramount Global.

On-air staff
Source:

Announcers, reporters and hosts
 Adam Zucker - host and play-by-play (2003–present)
 Brent Stover - host and play-by-play (2003–present)
 Grant Boone - reporter (2011–present)
 Dave Ryan - play-by-play (2006–present)
 Jason Knapp - play-by-play (2008–present)
 Tom McCarthy - host and play-by-play (2012–present)
 Matt Shepard - play-by-play (2008–present)
 Krista Blunk - reporter (2008–present)
 Ben Holden - play-by-play (2008–2020)
 Jim Rome - host and play-by-play (2012–present)
 John Sadak - play-by-play (2012–present)
 Carter Blackburn - play-by-play (2014–present)
 Andrew Catalon - play-by-play (2009–present)
 Brad Johansen - play-by-play (2012–present)
 Adam Schein - host and play-by-play (2012–present)
 Dave Popkin - play-by-play (2016–present)
 Dave Armstrong - play-by-play (2016–present)
 Mike Crispino - play-by-play (2017–present)
 Rich Waltz - play-by-play (2010–present)
 Dylan Jacobs -   play-by-play (2018–present)
 Errol Silverman - host (2022 - present)
 Tina Cervasio - reporter (2018–present)
 Ed Cohen - play-by-play (2017–present)
 Jason Horowitz - play-by-play (2018–present)
 Alex Del Barrio - play-by-play (2020–present)
 Joel Godett - play-by-play (2018–present)
 Michael Grady - play-by-play (present)
 Andy Greathouse - director (2003–present)
 Lisa Byington - reporter and play-by-play (2020–present)
 Chris Lewis - play-by-play (2021- present)
 Chris Sylvester - play-by-play (2022-present)
 Chick Hernandez - play-by-play (2022-present)

Football
 Corey Chavous - analyst (2012–present)
 Randy Cross - analyst (2008–present)
 Aaron Murray - analyst (2018–present)
 Houston Nutt - analyst (2011–present)
 Brian Jones - analyst (2003–present)
 Aaron Taylor - analyst (2009–present)

Basketball
 Alaa Abdelnaby - analyst (2012–present)
 Dan Bonner - analyst (2003–present)
 Mo Cassara - analyst (2018–present)
 Jordan Cornette - analyst (2016–present)
 Seth Davis - analyst (2003–present)
 Dan Dickau - analyst (2018–present)
 Tim Doyle - analyst (2015–present)
 Khalid El-Amin - analyst (2018–present)
 Pete Gillen - analyst (2008–present)
 Doug Gottlieb - analyst (2012–present)
 Danny Granger - analyst (2017–present)
 Steve Lappas - analyst (2008–present)
 Kyle Macy - analyst (2016–present)
 Donny Marshall - analyst (2020–present)
 Gary Parrish - analyst (2018–present)
 Chris Piper - analyst (2015–present)
 Jon Rothstein - analyst (2003–present)
 Chris Spatola - analyst (2012–present)
 Wally Szczerbiak - analyst (2003–present)
 Julianne Viani - analyst (2017–present)
 Bob Wenzel - analyst (2017–present)
 Steve Wolf - analyst (2018–present)
 Chris Walker - analyst (2022–present)

References

External links
 CBSSportsNetwork.com – CBS Sports Network official website
 CBSSports.com – CBS Sports official website

Sports Network
Sports television networks in the United States
Basketball on television in the United States
Gridiron football on television
Baseball on television in the United States
Television channels and stations established in 2002
English-language television stations in the United States
Paramount Global subsidiaries
2002 establishments in the United States